WASM or wasm may refer to:

 Western Australian School of Mines, a tertiary institution revolving around Western Australia's mining industry based in Kalgoorlie and Perth, Western Australia
 WASM (FM), a radio station (91.1 FM) licensed to Natchez, Mississippi, United States
 Watcom Assembler, or its successor Open Watcom Assembler, an x86 assembler
 WebAssembly (Wasm), a binary format for use in web browsers
 Merdei Airport (ICAO code), Indonesia; See List of airports by ICAO code: W